Rangeline is an unincorporated community located in the towns of Day and Green Valley, Marathon County, Wisconsin, United States. It is located along County Road C approximately 6 miles East of State Highway 97, or 3 miles East of Rozellville.

Notes

Unincorporated communities in Marathon County, Wisconsin
Unincorporated communities in Wisconsin